A partial solar eclipse occurred on November 12, 1928. A solar eclipse occurs when the Moon passes between Earth and the Sun, thereby totally or partly obscuring the image of the Sun for a viewer on Earth. A partial solar eclipse occurs in the polar regions of the Earth when the center of the Moon's shadow misses the Earth.

Related eclipses

Solar eclipses 1928–1931

Metonic series

References

External links 

1928 11 12
1928 in science
1928 11 12
November 1928 events